Cibola most commonly refers to: 

 Cevola (sometimes Sevola) or Cibola, the Spanish transliteration of a native name for a pueblo (Hawikuh Ruins) conquered by Francisco Vázquez de Coronado
 One of the Seven Cities of Gold, the Spanish legend that Coronado tracked to Hawikuh
 The Zuni-Cibola Complex, which contains the Hawikuh Ruins
 Cibola County, New Mexico, where the Hawikuh Ruins are located
 The Cibola National Forest, a disjoint forest stretching from New Mexico to Oklahoma, including parts of Cibola County, New Mexico

It may also refer to:
 Cibola, Arizona
 Cibola High School (Albuquerque, New Mexico)
 Cibola High School (Yuma, Arizona)
 "Cibola", a 1966 episode of the TV series Daniel Boone
 Cibola Burn, a novel in "The Expanse" series

See also
 Cebolla
 El Dorado
 Quivira, a city visited by Coronado in his quest for the mythical seven Cities of Gold